HSTS may refer to:

 Homosexual transsexual, controversial term for trans women who are attracted to men or trans men who are attracted to women 
 HTTP Strict Transport Security, a web security policy mechanism
 Hs and Ts, a mnemonic used for cardiac arrests